The Sailor Moon Role-Playing Game and Resource Book is a 1998 role-playing game written by Mark C. MacKinnon, published by Guardians of Order.

Contents
The Sailor Moon Role-Playing Game and Resource Book is a game in which Tri-Stat based rules are included.

Reception
The Sailor Moon Role-Playing Game and Resource Book was reviewed in the online second version of Pyramid which said "it was easy to put myself in the shoes of a typical anime fan -- and looking at this book from that point of view, it rocks."

Reviews
Knights of the Dinner Table Magazine #29 (March, 1999)
Backstab #14

References

Anime role-playing games
Guardians of Order games
Role-playing games introduced in 1998